Jérémy Fabrice Balmy (born 19 April 1994) is a French professional footballer who plays as a forward for FC Mantois 78.

Club career
Balmy began his career with Le Havre, and went on trial at a number of English teams including Brighton & Hove Albion, Norwich City, Birmingham City and Notts County, before joining the latter in August 2013. He made his professional debut on 24 August 2013, in a 1–0 defeat against Stevenage.

Balmy joined Oxford United on 9 February 2015, on a short-term deal. He was loaned to Oxford City of the Conference North in March.

Following a trial with Swindon Town, Balmy signed for the club on an initial one-year contract. He was suspended by the club in April 2016 alongside Drissa Traoré and Brandon Ormonde-Ottewill, after pictures emerged on social media of the trio inhaling nitrous oxide gas.

In October 2016, Balmy returned to Le Havre to join their reserve squad.

Career statistics

Club

References

External links

1994 births
Living people
French footballers
Association football forwards
Le Havre AC players
Notts County F.C. players
Oxford United F.C. players
Swindon Town F.C. players
ESM Gonfreville players
Trélissac FC players
FC Mantois 78 players
Championnat National 2 players
Championnat National 3 players
English Football League players